Goran Antić (born 4 July 1985) is a Swiss footballer of Bosnian descent who plays as a striker.

Career 
On 23 February 2009 the forward has left FC Aarau of the Swiss Super League, to join his former club FC Winterthur.

International career
Antić is a former youth international and was in the Swiss U-17 squad that won the 2002 U-17 European Championships.

Honours
 UEFA U-17 European Champion: 2002

References

External links
 Statistics at T-Online.de 
 football.ch profile

1985 births
Living people
Swiss men's footballers
Switzerland youth international footballers
Switzerland under-21 international footballers
FC Aarau players
FC Wil players
FC Winterthur players
FC Vaduz players
Swiss expatriate footballers
Swiss expatriate sportspeople in Liechtenstein
Expatriate footballers in Liechtenstein
Swiss Super League players
Association football forwards
Swiss people of Bosnia and Herzegovina descent
Swiss people of Serbian descent